The County of Greenland was an amt (county) of Denmark, comprising Greenland and its associated islands, before home rule was granted to Greenland.

History
In 1953 Greenland's colonial status ended with the establishment of the 1953 Danish constitution. When the colonial status ended, Greenland was incorporated into the Danish realm as an Amt (county) which gave Greenlanders Danish  citizenship, as a result of this, a change in Danish policies toward Greenland that consisted of a strategy of cultural assimilation. During this period, the Danish government promoted the exclusive use of Danish in official matters, and required Greenlanders to go to Denmark for their post-secondary education; many Greenlandic children grew up in boarding schools in southern Denmark, many losing their cultural ties to Greenland. The policy also backfired to produce a reassertion of Greenlandic cultural identity by the Greenlandic elite, leading to a movement in favour of independence that reached its peak in the 1970s; because of this, a further desire to establish the legality of Greenland's status formed in Denmark, resulting in the Home Rule Act of 1979, which gave Greenland limited autonomy with its own legislature taking control of some internal policies, while the Parliament of Denmark maintained full control of external policies, security, and natural resources. The law came into effect on 1 May 1979.

See also
Kingdom of Denmark
North Greenland
South Greenland
The unity of the Realm
List of governors of Greenland
Faroe Islands

References

History of Greenland
Geographic history of Denmark
Greenland County
1953 establishments in North America
1979 disestablishments in North America
1950s establishments in Greenland
1970s disestablishments in Greenland